The Air Command Commander Tandem is an American autogyro that was designed and produced by Air Command International of Wylie, Texas. Now out of production, when it was available the aircraft was supplied as a kit for amateur construction.

The design was later developed into the longer-landing gear equipped and heavier gross weight Air Command Tandem that remained in production in 2014.

Design and development
The Commander Tandem was developed from the single-seat Air Command Commander and was designed to comply with the US Experimental - Amateur-built aircraft rules. It features a single main rotor, a two-seats-in tandem open cockpit with a small cockpit fairing with a windshield, tricycle landing gear with wheel pants, plus a tail caster and a twin cylinder, liquid-cooled, two-stroke, dual-ignition  Rotax 582 engine or Mazda powerplant in pusher configuration.

The aircraft fuselage is made from metal tubing.

Operational history
In June 2014 no examples were registered in the United States with the Federal Aviation Administration, although a total of two had been registered at one time.

Specifications (Commander Tandem)

See also
List of rotorcraft

References

External links
Photo of an Air Command Commander Tandem

Commander Tandem
1990s United States sport aircraft
Homebuilt aircraft
Single-engined pusher autogyros